Scotty Maurice Pippen Jr. (born November 10, 2000) is an American professional basketball player for the Los Angeles Lakers of the National Basketball Association (NBA), on a two-way contract with the South Bay Lakers of the NBA G League. He played college basketball for the Vanderbilt Commodores. He is the son of former NBA player and Hall of Famer Scottie Pippen and television personality Larsa Pippen.

Early life and high school career
Pippen was born in Portland, Oregon, while his father was playing for the Portland Trail Blazers.  From his father's previous relationships, he has four older half siblings: Antron, Sierra, Taylor, and Tyler. Antron and Tyler Pippen are both deceased. His father's relationship with his mother, Larsa Pippen, led to three future younger full siblings: Preston, Justin, and Sophia. Pippen is Assyrian on his mother's side.

From kindergarten to tenth grade, Scotty attended Pine Crest School in Florida where he gave his first post game interview as a sophomore. Then before his junior year, his family moved to the LA area and he transferred to Sierra Canyon School in Chatsworth, California which had a more competitive basketball team. At Sierra, he played alongside future NBA players such as Marvin Bagley III, Kenyon Martin Jr., and Cassius Stanley. As a senior, he averaged 16.3 points, 4.6 assists, and 3.6 rebounds per game and helped his team win the California Interscholastic Federation Open Division state title. Pippen competed for the Oakland Soldiers on the Amateur Athletic Union circuit. He committed to a future playing college basketball for Vanderbilt over offers from Washington State, San Francisco, Colorado State, UC Santa Barbara, and Hofstra.

College career
On November 20, 2019, Pippen scored a freshman season-high 21 points in a 90–72 win over Austin Peay. In his regular season finale on March 7, 2020, he scored 21 points for a second time in an 83–74 victory over South Carolina. As a freshman, Pippen averaged 12 points and 3.6 rebounds per game, earning Southeastern Conference (SEC) All-Freshman Team honors.

The impending departures of future NBA players Aaron Nesmith and Saben Lee led to a future expectation of a leading role on the team, which came to fruition in his sophomore season. On December 27, 2020, Pippen scored 30 points in an 87–50 win over Alcorn State. On January 9, 2021, he recorded his first double-double, with 18 points and 12 assists in an 84–81 loss to Mississippi State. On January 27, 2021, Pippen scored 32 points in a 78–71 loss to Florida. As a sophomore, he averaged 20.8 points, 2.8 rebounds, and 4.9 assists per game. On April 10, 2021, Pippen declared for the 2021 NBA draft while maintaining his future college eligibility. He later withdrew from the draft returning to Vanderbilt for his junior season. On December 7, 2021, Pippen made a last second three-pointer to tie the game against Temple. As a junior, he averaged 20.4 points, 4.5 assists, 3.6 rebounds, and 1.9 steals per game. He was named to the First Team All-SEC as a junior. On April 18, 2022, Pippen declared for the 2022 NBA draft, forgoing his remaining future college eligibility.

Professional career

Los Angeles / South Bay Lakers (2022–present)
After going unselected in the 2022 NBA draft, Pippen signed a two-way contract with the Los Angeles Lakers on July 1, 2022, splitting time with their G League affiliate, the South Bay Lakers. Pippen joined the Lakers' 2022 NBA Summer League roster. In his Summer League debut, Pippen scored fourteen points, six rebounds, three assists, and a block in a 100–66 win over the Miami Heat. He was named to the G League's inaugural Next Up Game for the 2022–23 season.

Career statistics

College

|-
| style="text-align:left;"| 2019–20
| style="text-align:left;"| Vanderbilt
| 32 || 31 || 29.8 || .393 || .362 || .709 || 2.8 || 3.6 || 1.1 || .1 || 12.0
|-
| style="text-align:left;"| 2020–21
| style="text-align:left;"| Vanderbilt
| 22 || 22 || 31.8 || .428 || .358 || .850 || 2.9 || 4.9 || 1.8 || .2 || 20.8
|-
| style="text-align:left;"| 2021–22
| style="text-align:left;"| Vanderbilt
| 36 || 36 || 33.1 || .416 || .325 || .749 || 3.6 || 4.5 || 1.9 || .2 || 20.4
|- class="sortbottom"
| style="text-align:center;" colspan="2"| Career
| 90 || 89 || 31.6 || .414 || .343 || .763 || 3.1 || 4.3 || 1.6 || .2 || 17.5

Personal life
Pippen is the son of Hall of Fame basketball player Scottie Pippen, who won six NBA championships during his 17-year career in the league, and media personality Larsa Pippen, a cast member on The Real Housewives of Miami.

He is the cousin of Kavion Pippen who is an American professional basketball player for the Long Island Nets of the NBA G League and played college basketball for the Southern Illinois Salukis.

References

External links
Vanderbilt Commodores bio

2000 births
Living people
American men's basketball players
American people of Assyrian descent
Basketball players from Portland, Oregon
Los Angeles Lakers players
Point guards
Sierra Canyon School alumni
South Bay Lakers players
Undrafted National Basketball Association players
Vanderbilt Commodores men's basketball players